Pietro Antonio Lorenzoni (Cles in Tyrol, 1721 – Salzburg, 1782) was an Austrian painter who is believed to have painted several portraits of Wolfgang Amadeus Mozart and his family: "The Boy Mozart" (1763), his sister Maria Anna Mozart in "Nannerl as a Child" (1763) and a portrait of their father Leopold Mozart (c. 1765). He arrived in Salzburg, Austria in the 1740s and first wanted to paint Wolfgang and Nannerl. His protégé, Johann Nepomuk della Croce, painted a Mozart family portrait in 1780.

References 

Austrian portrait painters
18th-century Austrian painters
18th-century Austrian male artists
Austrian male painters
1721 births
1782 deaths
People from Cles